Rohilanwali, is a popular town of Muzaffargarh District in the Punjab province of Pakistan.

Geography
The city of Rohilanwali is located in the southern Punjab province. It forms a strip between the river Chenab on its east and Indus river on its West. The area around the city is a flat, alluvial plain and is ideal for agriculture, with many Citrus and Mango farms. The land is very fertile.

Climate
Rohilanwali features an Arid climate with very hot summers and mild winters. The city witnesses some of the most extreme weather in the country. The highest recorded temperature is approximately 54 °C (129 °F), and the lowest recorded temperature is approximate −1 °C (30 °F). The average rainfall is roughly 127 millimeters (5.0 in). Dust storms are a common occurrence within the city.
Places near Rohilanwali

Welfare programs
For the welfare and betterment of this area, a society named Youth Empowerment Society (YES) is voluntarily doing career counseling among school students and helps teachers to build a better nation. Team YES, led by Mr. Usman Fiaz, is dedicated and passionate about its work and is always available to help younger students.

Transportation

Rohilanwali has connections with other cities by a variety of means of transportation. The city is linked with Muzaffargarh, DG Khan, Layyah and Multan districts through concrete roads. Buses to Multan leave frequently, since it is located closely to the city. There are a variety of buses travelling farther from the city. Many of them are now air-conditioned with a fairly good safety record. The N-5 connects the city to connect to all parts of Pakistan. The road otherwise, known as GT Road, allows connections to Rawalpindi, Islamabad, Faisalabad, Karachi, Lahore as well as Bahawalpur.

Railway
After Reaching Muzaffargarh it is connected by rail with all parts of the country and lies on the Branch track between Rawalpindi, Multan, Mianwali and Attock. The main Peshawar-Karachi railway line passes through Multan district.

Airport
The People of Rohilanwali use Multan International Airport because it is nearer and on 45 min drive Multan International Airport is an airport situated 10 km away from the city center of Multan. It is not as large as the other airports in Pakistan, as it operates to cater mainly to the population of Multan, Vehari, Khanewal, Rajanpur, Sahiwal, and Pakpattan to mainly to other points within Pakistan as well as the Middle East. Flight are currently operated by the national flag carrier, Pakistan International Airlines. However, since the growth of air travel within the region, there has been speculated interest from other private carriers. The rise in air-travel has also led to the expansion of the current airport with a new runway and terminal.

Agriculture

Major crops
Cotton, Wheat, and  Sugarcane are the main crops grown in Rohilanwali. Rice, Jawar, Bajra, Moong, Mash, Masoor, peanuts, Maize and oil seeds such as rape, Mustard and Sunflower are also grown in minor quantities in the district.

Fruits
Mangoes, dates, citrus and pomegranate are the main fruits grown in Rohilanwali. Dates, Jaman, Pears, Phalsa and Bananas are also grown in minor quantities in the city.

Vegetables
Onions, Carrots, Cauliflower, Moolis and peas are the main vegetables grown in Rohilanwali. Okra, Turnips, Tomatoes, Potatoes, garlic and Chilies are also grown in the city in minor quantities.

Forests
In whole district Muzaffargarh, An area of 100,864 acres is forested. There is also linear plantation of 1250 A.V. mile the roads/rails/canals in the district. Trees grown in the area are Kikar, Shisham, Mullberry, Eucalyptus, Bamboo and coconut.

Neighbouring areas
Fifty six kilometres south of Rohilanwali lies Panjnad Head Works, where five rivers meet: Sutlej, Ravi, Chanab, Beas and Indus.
Rohillan Wali is a Tehsil level town and its people hopes that it will became Tehsil soon. Surrounding Mouza of  Rohillan Wali are :

Rohillan Wali

Gulab Wala

Lohar wala ( East & West)

Bhounday Wali

Alouday Wali

Ibrahim Wali

Ponta Malanra

Makhen Bela

Pati Darigh

Khadhi Balocha

Mahal Khakhi (North & South)

Mochi Wali (West & East)

References

External links
 Rohilanwali at Facebook
 Rohilanwali at Twitter

Populated places in Muzaffargarh District